Gennady Nikolayevich Troshev (14 March 1947 –  14 September 2008) was a Russian Colonel General in the Russian military and formerly the commander of the North Caucasus Military District, including Chechnya, during the Second Chechen War. He was awarded a Hero of Russia award.

Biography

Early years 
Gennady Troshev was born in 1947 in the East Berlin, in the Soviet occupation zone, the son of a Soviet officer. He spent his childhood in the ethnic Russian community in  Grozny in  the Chechen-Ingush Republic.

Military career 
In 1969, Troshev graduated from the Kazan Tank College, and later from the Tank Academy and from the Military Academy of the General Staff. After graduating from the tank college in 1969, Troshev served in Soviet tank forces. Troshev served as the commander of the 10th Guards Uralsko-Lvovskaya Tank Division, later - as the commander of the 42nd Army Corps. and as the commander of the joint group of federal forces in Chechnya during the First Chechen War. On 1 June 1995, Troshev was appointed commander of the 58th Army, and since 29 July 1997, he served as the deputy commander of the North Caucasus Military District. In April 2000, Troshev was appointed the commander of the joint group of federal forces in the Northern Caucasus.

During his career as a commander in Chechnya he gained notoriety after advocating public executions of separatist fighters. Human rights activists had accused him of tolerating rampant abuses in the war-ravaged republic. Early in the war he declared that the shattered city of Grozny should never be rebuilt so as to serve as a warning against "treason to Russia's ethnic minorities". He also publicly defended Yuri Budanov, who was on trial for the murder of an 18-year-old Chechen woman, Elza Kungayeva.

Post military career 
Troshev publicly defied, on national television, Minister of Defense Sergei Ivanov's suggestion that he should relocate from Chechnya in the North Caucasus Military District to the command of the Siberian Military District. In response, President Vladimir Putin signed a decree dismissing Troshev from his post in 2002.

The Jamestown Foundation, a U.S. policy research organisation that studies Russian military affairs, said Ivanov's order that Troshev relocate to Siberia was "open to multiple and complex interpretations. One theory connects it to a broader reshuffling of personnel as major elections approach in Chechnya (and perhaps in response to the Moscow theater hostage crisis). A second explanation ties it to the stalled process of military-administrative reform."

After his sacking, Troshev was appointed an advisor to the President of the Russian Federation for Cossacks affairs.

Final years and death 
From 2000 onwards Trosheva worked as the civil service personnel and promoted a number of important legislative papers. 

Troshev died on 14 September 2008. He was a passenger aboard Aeroflot Flight 821, which crashed and left no survivors. Russian officials have dismissed public suspicions that the plane might have been sabotaged.

One week after Troshev's death, the President of the Chechen Republic Ramzan Kadyrov renamed Krasnoznamennaya Street in Grozny after Troshev.

Military medals and ribbons

References

External links 
 Фонд патриотического воспитания молодёжи имени генерала Геннадия Николаевича Трошева
 Биография Геннадия Трошева на сайте Президента России 

1947 births
2008 deaths
Victims of aviation accidents or incidents in Russia
Heroes of the Russian Federation
Recipients of the Order of Military Merit (Russia)
Recipients of the Order of Friendship of Peoples
Recipients of the Medal of Zhukov
People of the Chechen wars
Russian colonel generals
Advisers to the President of Russia
People from Grozny
People from East Berlin